Saint Thomas the Apostle was one of the twelve disciples of Jesus.

It may also refer to:

Places
St Thomas the Apostle, London, parish church in the City of London, destroyed in 1666
St Thomas, Exeter, a large civil parish in Devon, England
St Thomas the Apostle Rural, a civil parish in east Cornwall, United Kingdom

Other
St. Thomas' Church (disambiguation), multiple churches with the name
St Thomas the Apostle College, a Roman Catholic secondary school for boys in Nunhead, London.
St. Thomas the Apostle Minor Seminary, a preparatory seminary of the Roman Catholic Diocese of Faisalabad in Pakistan